Argos most often refers to:

 Argos, Peloponnese, a city in Argolis, Greece
 Argus (Greek myth), several characters in Greek mythology
 Argos (retailer), a catalogue retailer in the United Kingdom and Ireland

Argos or ARGOS may also refer to:

Businesses
 Argos Comunicación, a Mexican television and film company
 Argos Energies, a Dutch oil and gas company 
 Grupo Argos, a Colombian cement and energy conglomerate
 Argos (retailer), a catalogue retailer in the United Kingdom and Ireland

Places
 Argos, Peloponnese, a city in Argolis, Greece
 Argos-Mykines, the municipality
 Argos (Nisyros), an ancient settlement on Nisyros island, Greece
 Amphilochian Argos, an ancient settlement in Amphilochia, Greece
 Argos Orestiko, a town in Kastoria, Greece
 Argos Pelasgikon, an ancient settlement in Thessaly, Greece
 Argos (river), a river in Spain
 Argos, Indiana, a town in the United States

Fictional places
 Argos (Conan), a fictional nation in the world of Conan the Barbarian
 Argos (Stargate), a fictional planet in the Stargate SG-1 universe

Science and technology
 Argos (EGFR Inhibitor), a protein in Drosophila melanogaster
 ARGOS (optics system), a multi-star optics system
 ARGOS (satellite), an American research and development space mission
 Argos (satellite system), a satellite-based system for environmental data collection
 ARGOS DSS, a decision support system for crisis management

Vehicles 
 BRM Argos, a Portuguese microlight aircraft
 Argos-class patrol boat, a ship class of the Portuguese Navy
 Renault Argos, a concept car

Other uses
 Argus (Greek myth), several characters in Greek mythology
 Argos (dog), Odysseus' dog in the Odyssey
 Argos (radio program), a Dutch documentary series
 Eddie Argos (born 1979), English musician
 Argos-Shimano, a former cycling team
 Task Force Argos, a branch of the Queensland Police Service
 Toronto Argonauts or Argos, a Canadian Football League team
 Minister Argos, a villain from the manga and anime Great Mazinger

See also
 Agros (disambiguation)
 Argo (disambiguation)
 Argos Hill (disambiguation)
 Argosy (disambiguation)
 Argus (disambiguation)